Damith Chandima Bandara Wijayathunga (born 1991 as දමිත් විජයතුංග)), popularly as Damith Wijayathunga is an actor in television and a model. He is the winner of Mister Sri Lanka in 2017.

Personal life
Wijayathunga was born on 1991, in Matale as the eldest of the family with three siblings. He has two younger brothers. He started primary education from Vijaya College, Matale. After passing grade 5 scholarship, he attended St Thomas' College, Matale for his secondary education and then entered Government Science College, Matale for G.C.E O/L and A/L. During school times, he was excellent in cricket and athletics, specially in the 100-200 meters track events. After passing A/Ls, he graduated in Computer Science from National School of Business Management (NSBM).

He married his longtime partner Udara Tennakoon where the wedding was celebrated on 26 July 2021.

Career
He started to act in several advertisements, where he got to know by Sameera Weerasinghe in 2015. Then he participated for many modeling exhibitions.

In 2017, he won the title of Mister Sri Lanka and then represented Sri Lanka for "Man of the World 2017" pageant held on July 18 in the Philippines.

In 2019, he started acting in the television serial Hadawathe Kathawa telecast by Swarnavahini. He was selected to the role "Ravindra" by Saranga Mendis. The show became highly popular. In 2020, he presented the music chart show telecast in ITN.

References

External links
 දමිත් විජයතුංග සමග අද Y FM After School

1991 births
Living people
Sinhalese male actors
Sri Lankan male models
People from Matale